Ronald Clair Roat (April 4, 1946 – November 28, 2013) was the author of the Stuart Mallory Mystery Series.  He graduated from Michigan State University in 1968 with a bachelor's in journalism.  Later that year he was drafted into the U.S. Army and served about two years with a Nike Hercules missile battalion near Pittsburgh, Pa.  Before becoming a journalism professor, he worked for several newspapers as a professional reporter, editor, or columnist. The newspapers included the Lansing State Journal, Dominion News (Morgantown, W.Va.), Dayton Daily News, and The Times in Frankfort, Ind.  He served as a journalism professor at the University of Southern Indiana in Evansville, Indiana, between 1986 and 2008 when he retired.

Stuart Mallory Mystery Series

The series consists of three books: 
Close Softly the Doors
A Still and Icy Silence
High Walk

References

1968 births
People from Pontiac, Michigan
Michigan State University alumni
University of Southern Indiana faculty
American mystery writers
2013 deaths
American male novelists
20th-century American novelists
20th-century American male writers
Novelists from Indiana